Club Sport Boys Warnes is a professional football team based in Warnes, Santa Cruz de la Sierra, Bolivia that competes in the Bolivian Primera División.

History
The club was founded on 17 August 1954. The club reached in 2013 the second place of the Liga Nacional B and was for the first time in its history promoted to the Bolivian Primera División. Warnes signed to the beginning of 2014 the former Argentine footballer Néstor Clausen as new coach. The club ranks 2014 three internationals for the Bolivia national football team with goalkeeper Sergio Galarza, defender Carlos Mendoza and Joaquín Botero.

In 2014, sitting Bolivian president Evo Morales signed a contract for 200 dollars a month with Sports Boys Warnes, becoming the oldest active professional soccer player in the world.

Current squad
As of 3 May 2018

Notable managers
 Hilda Ordoñez (2013)
 Néstor Clausen (2014), (2014–15)

National honours
First Division – LPFB Era: 1
 2015 Apertura

External links

Club logo

References

 
Association football clubs established in 1954
Football clubs in Bolivia
1954 establishments in Bolivia
Santa Cruz Department (Bolivia)